Krasnoznamensk is the name of several urban localities in Russia:
Krasnoznamensk, Kaliningrad Oblast, a town in Krasnoznamensky District of Kaliningrad Oblast
Krasnoznamensk, Moscow Oblast, a closed town in Moscow Oblast;